is a Japanese nonfiction manga series authored by Hirohiko Yokomi and illustrated by Naoe Kikuchi. The manga was serialized in Shogakukan's seinen manga magazine Monthly Ikki between 2001 and 2006. A thirteen-episode anime television series adaptation by Group TAC was broadcast in 2007.

Overview
Tetsuko no Tabi is a nonfiction series. It is inspired on the book Getting On and Off of JR’s 4600 Stations by Hirohiko Yokomi, published in 1998, which chronicles his experience visiting all of Japan rail's train stations. The editor in chief of Shogakukan's Monthly Ikki, Hideki Egami, wanted to recapture Yokomi's experience in manga. Masahiko Ishikawa, Shogakukan's editor and a rail fan, recruited Naoe Kikuchi, a new manga artist who worked with Shogakukan on a number of shorts, and this would be her first serialized work. Tetsuko no Tabi is about Kikuchi herself, traveling with Yokomi and Ishikawa, illustrating a manga based on their experiences.

Characters
Hirohiko Yokomi
 
The travel-writer, who turns out to be a huge train-fan. He has a lot of energy and passion for trains, and sometimes girls, but also micro-manages all their trips, planning every detail down to the second. He cares mostly about following the schedule and successfully achieving his planned goals (e.g. visiting all stations on a line in a completely bizarre order to accommodate infrequent trains).
Naoe Kikuchi
 
A manga artist. She has no interest in trains whatsoever, and she keeps getting freaked out by Yokomi's antics. She is also cynical, sarcastic, and rather lazy, mainly looking forward to the next ekiben.
Masahiko Ishikawa
 
Kikuchi's editor, another train geek.
Masaki Kamimura

Kikuchi's second editor.

Media

Manga
Created by Hirohiko Yokomi and Naoe Kikuchi, Tetsuko no Tabi debuted in Shogakukan's Spirits Zōkan Ikki on November 30, 2001. The series finished on October 25, 2006. Shogakukan collected its chapters in six tankōbon volumes, released from November 30, 2004, to February 28, 2007. The series was again intermittently serialized from 2007, with chapters collected in a single volume, titled Tetsuko no Tabi Plus, released on February 25, 2009.

A sequel, titled , illustrated by Kanoko Hoashi, was serialized in Monthly Ikki from May 25, 2009, to January 25, 2013. Shogakukan collected its chapters in five tankōbon, released from February 25, 2010, to March 29, 2013.

Another manga series, titled , illustrated by Akira Kirioka, was serialized in Monthly Sunday Gene-X from May 19, 2016, to January 19, 2019. Shogakukan collected its chapters in four volumes, released from February 17, 2017, to July 19, 2019.

Anime
A thirteen-episode anime television series adaptation by Group TAC was broadcast on the cable television station Family Gekijo from June 24 to September 23, 2007.

Notes

References

External links
 Official anime website 
 

2001 manga
Autobiographical anime and manga
Group TAC
Non-fiction comics
Railway culture in Japan
Seinen manga
Shogakukan manga